Alan D. Solomont (born 1949) is the former United States Ambassador to Spain and Andorra. He was selected for the post by President Barack Obama and confirmed by the United States Senate on December 29, 2009.

Early life and education
Born to a Jewish family, Solomont earned a B.A. from Tufts University in Political Science and Urban Studies in 1970 and a degree in nursing from the University of Massachusetts Lowell in 1977.

Career
Active for many years in the Democratic Party, Solomont served as National Finance Chairman of the Democratic National Committee (DNC) in 1997, raising over $40 million.

Solomont serves on the boards of numerous organizations including Angel Healthcare Investors, LLC, Boston Medical Center, The Jewish Fund for Justice, The New Israel Fund, Israel Policy Forum, Jewish Community Housing for the Elderly, and the WGBH Educational Foundation. He chairs the Board of Combined Jewish Philanthropies of Greater Boston.

On June 13, 2013, Solomont was appointed the Pierre and Pamela Omidyar Dean of the Jonathan M. Tisch College of Civic Life at Tufts University in Medford, Massachusetts and announced his intention to retire in 2021.

Awards and recognitions 
Solomont received an honorary degree from the University of Massachusetts Lowell. In 2017, the university renamed its School of Nursing to the Susan and Alan Solomont School of Nursing.

Personal life
He is married to Susan Solomont and they live in Weston, MA; they have two daughters, Rebecca and Stephanie.

References

External links
 U.S. Embassy in Spain
 

|-

1949 births
Ambassadors of the United States to Andorra
Ambassadors of the United States to Spain
20th-century American Jews
Living people
21st-century American Jews
21st-century American diplomats